British International School of Chicago, Lincoln Park (BISC Lincoln Park) is a private international school for Pre-Nursery to Year 6 students (ages 15+ months to 11 years) located in the Clybourn Corridor of Chicago, Illinois. In September 2001, BISC Lincoln Park was the fourth school to open in the United States by the British Schools of America and first campus to open in the Midwest.  The private elementary school is divided into three learning stages: Early Years Foundation Stage (pre-nursery, nursery school and Pre-K, ages 15+ months to 5), Key Stage 1 (primary school, ages 5 to 7), and Key Stage 2 (primary school, ages 7 to 11).

History 
British International School of Chicago, Lincoln Park (originally British School of Chicago) opened its door in the Edgewater community area on the north side of the city in 2001 nearby the Manor House in Bryn Mawr Historic District for parents seeking an alternative to the public school model. In 2008, the school relocated to a newly constructed building in the Lincoln Park neighborhood.

Campus 

The 75,000 square foot, five-story campus for British International School of Chicago, Lincoln Park was designed for an enrollment of up to 650 students and a 70-person staff. The campus features an architectural framework of columns and beams, a curving exterior, prominently placed bay windows, and high-ceiling gym on the upper floors. The building features more than 40 learning spaces, including an indoor and outdoor physical development space, robotics and science labs, a maker space, dance studio, library and a STEAM corridor meant to bridge different areas of learning.

Students
British International School of Chicago, Lincoln Park serves Pre-Nursery through Year 6 students ages 15 months to 11 years. The majority of pupils are Americans but with many dual nationals and heritages, has over 40 nationalities in the school who populate Chicago's large foreign-born population.

Curriculum
British International School of Chicago, Lincoln Park bases its values-based, global education learning goals on the International Primary Curriculum (IPC) and the National Curriculum. The school teaches art, entrepreneurship and innovation, information and computing technology, literacy, math, modern foreign languages, music, physical and health education, and science. In particular, the Chicago school emphasizes the benefits of a STEAM program, collaborates with the Massachusetts Institute of Technology (MIT) to implement a STEAM program based on a multi-disciplinary approach pioneered by MIT, is part of the Juilliard-Nord Anglia Performing Arts Program, operates its own music school, and participates in the Nord Anglia Education Global Campus program.

Global Initiatives & Collaborations

Juilliard Nord-Anglia Performing Arts Program 

In February 2015, Nord Anglia Education and  The Juilliard School selected British International School of Chicago, Lincoln Park as one of ten Nord Anglia schools to pilot the launch of the Juilliard Nord Anglia-Performing Arts Program. The campus officially implemented the program in the fall term of 2015. Since then, The Juilliard School has been named the world's best university for the study of performing arts, and BISC Lincoln Park and students have received visits and performed for Juilliard President Dr. Joseph W. Polisi and Juilliard faculty member and Grammy-award winning artist Itzhak Perlman. Studies have shown that a performing arts program improves test scores, reading proficiency, and overall academic achievement. The learning-model program is built around the key works of music, dance, and drama with special visits and workshops led by various Juilliard alumni.

The Cannes Corporate Media & TV Awards festival held in October 2016 showcased a Silver Dolphin winning short film featuring Juilliard alumni the Peter and Will Anderson Trio workshopping and performing with students at BISC Lincoln Park's campus.

Massachusetts Institute of Technology Collaboration 
In early summer of 2016, British International School of Chicago, Lincoln Park announced it will become one of the 13 inaugural Nord Anglia Education schools to collaborate with Massachusetts Institute of Technology (MIT) to enhance science, technology, engineering, arts and maths (STEAM) teaching and learning for K-12 students. Launching in September 2016, the program includes the development of a series of in-school challenges for students which focus on the juncture between the five STEAM disciplines. Nord Anglia CEO Fitzmaurice believes the collaboration will ensure students are equipped with the skills to succeed in the future workplace.

Awards & Accreditation

Awards 
In 2006, British International School of Chicago, Lincoln Park (then British School of Chicago) won the British Consul General Award from the British American Business Council for advancing relations between the U.K. and the U.S. as well as increasing the company's international exposure.

Accreditation 
British International School of Chicago, Lincoln Park is accredited by the International Primary Curriculum (IPC) and the Council of International Schools (CIS). In 2010, the private school was the fourth only in the world to achieve "mastering" level in all areas in delivering the IPC. As of March 2016, the school is applying for Council of British International Schools (COBIS) accreditation.

Parent Company 

British International School of Chicago, Lincoln Park is owned by Nord Anglia Education.

External links
British International School of Chicago, Lincoln Park website
Council of International Schools

References

British-American culture in Illinois
Chicago, IL
Private elementary schools in Chicago
Private middle schools in Chicago
Preparatory schools in Illinois
Private high schools in Chicago
International Baccalaureate schools in Illinois
Educational institutions established in 2001
Nord Anglia Education
2001 establishments in Illinois